Rocío Ruiz (born 26 November 1971) is a Spanish breaststroke swimmer. She competed in two events at the 1992 Summer Olympics.

References

External links
 

1971 births
Living people
Spanish female breaststroke swimmers
Olympic swimmers of Spain
Swimmers at the 1992 Summer Olympics
Place of birth missing (living people)
Mediterranean Games medalists in swimming
Mediterranean Games silver medalists for Spain
Swimmers at the 1991 Mediterranean Games
20th-century Spanish women